The Paul Keres Memorial Tournament is a chess tournament played in honour of chess grandmaster Paul Keres (1916–1975). It usually takes place in Vancouver, Canada and Tallinn, Estonia.

An annual international chess tournament has been held in Tallinn every other year since 1969. Keres won this tournament in 1971 and 1975. Starting in 1977 after Keres' death, it has been called the Paul Keres Memorial Tournament. From 1991, the tournament has been held yearly and changed into a rapid event. From 1999 this tournament also had a women's section. In the past twenty years, apart from this rapid tournament, several other memorial tournaments have been played in honour of Keres.

In 1975, Keres won a tournament in Vancouver. It was his last tournament he would ever play in, as on his way back to his native Estonia, he died from a heart attack. There has been an annual memorial tournament in Vancouver ever since.

Tallinn

Tallinn International
The Tallinn International has been held every other year from 1969 to 1989. It was named after Keres from 1977.
 
{| class="wikitable"
! # !! Year !! Winner 
|-
| 1||1969||Leonid Stein
|-
| 2||1971||Mikhail Tal    Paul Keres
|-
| 3||1973||Mikhail Tal
|-
| 4||1975||Paul Keres
|-
| 5||1977||Mikhail Tal
|-
| 6||1979||Tigran Petrosian
|-
| 7||1981||Mikhail Tal
|-
| 8||1983||Mikhail Tal  Rafael Vaganian
|-
| 9||1985||Sergey Dolmatov
|-
| 10||1987||Mikhail Gurevich
|-
| 11||1989||Georgy Timoshenko  Lembit Oll  Jaan Ehlvest
|}

Tallinn Rapid
From 1991 the Tallinn international has been replaced by an annual rapid tournament. From 1999, the tournament has had a separate women's section.

{| class="wikitable"
! # !! Year !! Winner !! Women's section
|-
| 1||1991||Anto Remmel
|-
| 2||1992||Leonid Yudasin
|-
| 3||1993||Jaan Ehlvest
|-
| 4||1994||Viktor Korchnoi
|-
| 5||1995||Lembit Oll
|-
| 6||1996||Vassily Ivanchuk
|-
| 7||1997||Viktor Gavrikov
|-
| 8||1998||Suat Atalık   Lembit Oll
|-
| 9||1999||Viktor Gavrikov || Tatiana Stepovaia
|-
| 10||2000||Vassily Ivanchuk || Tatiana Stepovaia
|-
| 11||2001||Jan Timman  || Viktorija Čmilytė
|-
| 12||2002||Viktor Gavrikov || Dana Reizniece
|- 
| 13||2003||Alexander Morozevich|| Pia Cramling
|-
| 14||2004||Alexei Shirov||Maia Chiburdanidze
|-
| 15||2005||Alexei Shirov||Ekaterina Kovalevskaya
|-
| 16||2006||Vassily Ivanchuk   Anatoly Karpov   Rustam Kasimdzhanov||Ilze Bērziņa
|-
| 18||2008||Vladimir Malakhov|| Ilze Bērziņa Viktorija Čmilytė
|-
| 19||2009||Alexey DreevVasily Yemelin||Elisabeth Pähtz
|-
| 20||2011||Alexei Shirov
|-
| 21||2012||Alexei Shirov
|-
| 22||2013||Alexei Shirov
|-
| 23||2014||Igor Kovalenko
|-
| 24||2015||Sergei Tiviakov
|-
| 25||2016||Igor Kovalenko
|-
|}

Keres Memorial Festival
In the 1990s there have been several Keres memorials in Tallinn which were played at regular time control. These tournaments seem to have been held irregularly. At present there is an annual Keres Memorial Festival which started in 2004 with a special rapid tournament, where Viswanathan Anand emerged as a winner, followed by a regular tournament. The winners of the regular tournament for 2004 and subsequent years are listed below. The field of these tournaments has been notably weaker than that of the rapid tournaments.

{| class="wikitable"
! Year !! Winner 
|-
|2004	||Kaido Külaots  Artem Smirnov
|-
|2005	||Meelis Kanep
|-
|2006	||Mikhail Rytshagov
|-
|2007	||Georgy Timoshenko
|-
|2008	||Vasily Yemelin
|-
|2010   ||Olav Sepp
|-
|2014   ||Alexandre Danin
|-
|}

Vancouver
The tournament in Vancouver has been played ever since Keres won it in 1975.  It was Keres' final tournament, as he died shortly thereafter.

References

Chess in Canada
Chess competitions
Chess in Estonia
Chess memorial tournaments